Lambert Folkers (died 1761) was a baker and politician. He served as a member of the 1st General Assembly of Nova Scotia; Folkers was in Halifax, Nova Scotia, by 1750. In 1761, he married Elizabeth Shelfers, his second wife. He was buried on July 9, 1761.

References 
 A Directory of the Members of the Legislative Assembly of Nova Scotia, 1758-1958, Public Archives of Nova Scotia (1958)

Year of birth missing
1761 deaths
Nova Scotia pre-Confederation MLAs